Pavel Sergeyevich Grachev (1 January 1948 – 23 September 2012), sometimes transliterated as Grachov or Grachyov, was a Russian Army General and the Defence Minister of the Russian Federation from 1992 to 1996; in 1988 he was awarded Hero of the Soviet Union gold star. As Defence Minister, Grachev gained notoriety because of his military incompetence displayed during the First Chechen War and the persistent allegations of involvement in enormous corruption scandals.

Life and career

In the Soviet Union
Grachev, born in 1948 in Tula Oblast, RSFSR, joined the Soviet Army's airborne troops in 1965 and finished the Ryazan Guards Higher Airborne Command School. In 1972, he joined the Soviet Communist Party. After commanding parachute platoons, companies and battalions in the 1970s, he attended the Frunze Military Academy and the General Staff Academy, graduating in 1981. During the Soviet–Afghan War, Grachev commanded the 345th Independent Guards Airborne Regiment from 1982 to 1983, and was in command of the 103rd Guards Airborne Division in Afghanistan in the last years of the Soviet involvement from 1985 to 1988.

In December 1990, he was appointed commander of the Soviet airborne troops. In August/December 1991, Grachev became the Soviet Union's First Deputy Minister of Defence during its break-up.

In the Russian Federation
For a period of time, in the early-to-mid-1990s, Grachev was a close friend of the President of Russia Boris Yeltsin, and held the post of the Minister of Defence of the Russian Federation from May 1992 to June 1996. Grachev took part in the Soviet coup attempt of 1991 and the events of the Russian constitutional crisis of 1993, during which he supported Yeltsin. In November 1994 Yeltsin called Grachev "the best defense minister of the decade."

Grachev was involved in the case of corruption in the Western Group of Forces in 1993-1994. Accusations were repeatedly made against Grachev in the Russian media in the illegal acquisition of imported Mercedes cars, which were issued with the help of the command of the Western Group of Forces. None of these accusations was disputed by Grachev in court, but he was also not held accountable.

In late 1994 through 1996, Grachev played a key role in initiating and leading the First Chechen War. He was one of authors of the idea to use force to "restore constitutional order" in the breakaway republic of Chechnya and publicly promised to swiftly crush the Chechen separatist forces "in a couple of hours with a single airborne regiment." He was rumoured to have launched the disastrous storming of Grozny while drunk during the celebrations of his 1 January birthday. As TIME commented in 1995: "Grachev had remarked recently that only an 'incompetent commander' would order tanks into the streets of central Grozny, where they would be vulnerable (...) Yet at the end of December he did it." Eventually, in July 1996, following his re-election, Yeltsin sacked the disgraced Grachev. The First Chechen War soon ended with more than 100,000 soldiers and civilians having lost their lives.

Grachev was suspected of being involved in the murder of Dmitry Kholodov, a Moskovsky Komsomolets journalist, in October 1994. At a criminal trial in a military court, where the defendants were officers of the 45th Guards Spetsnaz Brigade, in 2001 the ex-minister was forced to testify as a witness. The process ended with the acquittal of all defendants, the crime remained unsolved.

In December 1997, Grachev was appointed a senior military adviser to Rosvooruzhenie State Corporation, the Russian arms export monopoly. On 25 April 2007, Grachev was fired from this position.

Grachev died on 23 September 2012 of acute meningoencephalitis, in the Vishnevsky Military Hospital in Krasnogorsk. He was 64.

Popular culture
The archival footage of Grachev saying "tank regiments are commanded by total idiots; you send in the infantry first, then the tanks" is shown on TV in the 2002 film House of Fools.

Further reading
 Ostrovsky, Alexander (2011). Глупость или измена? Расследование гибели СССР. (Stupidity or treason? Investigation of the death of the USSR)  М.: Форум, Крымский мост-9Д, 2011. — 864 с. ISBN 978-5-89747-068-6.
 Ostrovsky, Alexander (2014). Расстрел «Белого дома». Чёрный октябрь 1993 (The shooting of the "White House". Black October 1993) — М.: «Книжный мир», 2014. — 640 с. ISBN 978-5-8041-0637-0

References

External links

 Grachev: Here for a While, The Moscow Times, 13 July 1995.
 Pavel Grachev: Disgraced but Indispensable, The Jamestown Foundation, 3 May 1996.
 Pavel Grachev, RusNet, 03.12.2003.

1948 births
2012 deaths
People from Tula Oblast
Communist Party of the Soviet Union members
Defence ministers of Russia
Generals of the army (Russia)
Soviet colonel generals
Soviet military personnel of the Soviet–Afghan War
People of the 1991 Soviet coup d'état attempt
People of the Chechen wars
Military Academy of the General Staff of the Armed Forces of the Soviet Union alumni
Frunze Military Academy alumni
Heroes of the Soviet Union
Recipients of the Order of Lenin
Recipients of the Order of the Red Banner
Commanders of the Soviet Airborne Forces
Ryazan Guards Higher Airborne Command School alumni